WRAR was a broadcast radio station licensed to Tappahannock, Virginia, serving Tappahannock and Warsaw in Virginia and was owned and operated by A.C.T.I.O.N., Inc.

History
The station began broadcasting on November 1, 1970. In the 1980s, the station aired a MOR-Adult contemporary format.  WRAR last aired a religious format as an affiliate of the LifeTalk Radio Network.  The station's last owner was A.C.T.I.O.N., Inc.

References

External links

RAR
Radio stations established in 1970
Radio stations disestablished in 2014
1970 establishments in Virginia
2014 disestablishments in Virginia
Defunct radio stations in the United States
RAR
RAR
Defunct religious radio stations in the United States